The Jaguar XJR-16 is an IMSA GTP sports prototype race car, with the aim of competing, from 1991, in the IMSA GT Championship. The Jaguar XJR-16s had a short lifespan, competing for only one season, before being hastily replaced with the Jaguar XJR-14.

Wins/Victories
300  km of Road Atlanta 1991 (Chassis 191)
1991 Mid-Ohio  300  km (Chassis 191) 
1991 Laguna Seca 300km  ( Chassis 191) 
300 km of Road America 1991 (Chassis 191)

Drivers
David Jones
Cor Euser
Scott Pruett
Scott Goodyear
Martin Brundle
David Brabham

References

External links

XJR-16
IMSA GTP cars
Rear mid-engine, rear-wheel-drive vehicles
24 Hours of Le Mans race cars
Sports prototypes